Austin O'Connor is an American folkstyle wrestler from Lockport, Illinois. During his collegiate career, he has been a two-time NCAA Wrestling Champion for the University of North Carolina. He won his first NCAA Title in 2021 in the 149lb weight class. Two years later in 2023, he followed up with another NCAA title at 157lbs. In total during his collegiate career, O'Connor was a five-time All-American, three-time conference champion and two-time national champion.

High School Career 
O'Connor is a four-time Wrestling State Champion in the state of Illinois for St. Rita of Cascia High School located in Ashburn, Chicago.

College career 
O'Connor is a five-time All-American, three-time Conference Champion, and Two-Time National Champion for The University of North Carolina at Chapel Hill in the sport of wrestling.

MMA career 
O'Connor has signed a management deal with American Kickboxing Academy. Other notable wrestlers that are part of AKA include Daniel Cormier, Khabib Nurmagomedov, and BJ Penn.

References 

1998 births
Living people
College wrestlers in the United States